Archita Ricci  (Urbino, 1560–1635) was an Italian painter active in Umbria, including Perugia, during 1599–1622.

Biography
The church of Sant'Ansano of Spoleto has a main altarpiece depicting Martyrdom of Sant'Ansano by Ricci. The portrait of the envoy Hasekura Tsunenaga of Japan near Pope Paul V, commissioned to Ricci in 1615 for the cardinal Scipione Borghese, was found at Rome's Palazzo Borghese. In the Church of San Nicolo in Montecastrilli in Umbria, Archita Ricci helped fresco the Cospani Chapel (1626).

References

16th-century Italian painters
Italian male painters
17th-century Italian painters
1560 births
1635 deaths
People from Urbino
Umbrian painters